Pertti Valkeapää (born 13 February 1951 in Tampere, Finland) is a retired professional ice hockey player who played for Tappara in the SM-liiga. He was inducted into the Finnish Hockey Hall of Fame in 1992.

External links
 Finnish Hockey Hall of Fame bio

1951 births
Finnish ice hockey players
Tappara players
Ice hockey people from Tampere
Living people
20th-century Finnish people